Chidley may refer to:

 Chidley, Devonshire, a former name of Chulmleigh, England
 Cape Chidley, Canada
 Cape Chidley Islands, Nunavut, Canada

People with the surname
Katherine Chidley (fl. 1616–1653), English activist